Legousia hybrida is a species of annual herb in the family Campanulaceae (bellflowers). They have a self-supporting growth form. They have simple, broad leaves.

Sources

References 

Endemic flora of Malta
Campanuloideae
Taxa named by Carl Linnaeus
Flora of Malta